Sumner Baldwin (March 8, 1833 in Ithaca, Tompkins County, New York – January 26, 1903) was an American merchant, banker and politician from New York.

Life
He attended the common schools. In 1856, he removed to Wellsville, and became a partner in his brother's grocery store. In 1866, the brothers sold the store, and engaged in tanning instead. In 1869, they sold the tanning plant, and opened the Bank of Wellsville.

In politics, he was a Republican. He was Supervisor of the Town of Wellsville for seven years.

He was a member of the New York State Assembly (Allegany Co.) in 1876 and 1877.

He was a member of the New York State Senate (27th D.) in 1882 and 1883.

Sources
 Civil List and Constitutional History of the Colony and State of New York compiled by Edgar Albert Werner (1884; pg. 291 and 375f)
 Sketches of the Members of the Legislatures in The Evening Journal Almanac (1883)
 Allegany County and Its People by John Stearns Minard (e-book)

References

1833 births
1903 deaths
Republican Party New York (state) state senators
People from Wellsville, New York
Republican Party members of the New York State Assembly
Town supervisors in New York (state)
American bankers
Politicians from Ithaca, New York
19th-century American politicians
19th-century American businesspeople